The Woman in the Advocate's Gown is a 1929 Norwegian-German silent drama film directed by Adolf Trotz and starring Aud Egede-Nissen, Paul Richter, and Fritz Kortner. The screenplay was based on 's novel Frk. Statsadvokat, published in 1929. It was shot at the EFA Studios in Berlin. The film's art direction was by Hans Jacoby.

Plot
A female lawyer commits suicide after discovering the forgery case she is prosecuting had been committed by her own father.

Cast
Aud Egede-Nissen as Jonne Holm
Paul Richter as Rolf Brönne
Fritz Kortner as Consul Backhaug
Mona Mårtenson as Agda, Rolf's cousin
Nikolai Malikoff as Wholesaler Holm
Wolfgang Zilzer as Leif Andersen
Synnøve Tessmann
Sigmund Ruud
Mildred Mehle
Ferdinand Bonn
Hugo Döblin
Hanni Reinwald

References

External links

1929 drama films
German drama films
Films of the Weimar Republic
German silent feature films
Films directed by Adolf Trotz
German black-and-white films
Norwegian drama films
Norwegian black-and-white films
Silent drama films
1920s German films
Films shot at Halensee Studios